Leñadores de Durango (English: Durango Lumberjacks) is a professional Mexican basketball team, based in Durango City. The Leñadores are part Liga Nacional de Baloncesto Profesional, the top professional basketball league in Mexico. The team play their home games at the Auditorio del Pueblo, with a capacity of 3,500 spectators.

The team was founded in 1979 and started playing at the now defunct Circuito Mexicano de Básquetbol till 1998, winning four championships. From 2002 to 2004, the Leñadores participated in the newly established Liga Nacional de Baloncesto Profesional. After an absence of more than ten years, Durango returned to professional basketball for the 2018–19 season.

History
The Leñadores were founded in 1979 by Duranguense businessmen who wanted to bring professional basketball to the Mexican state of Durango. Initially, the nickname Alacranes was proposed, due to scorpions being the most notable animal from Durango, nevertheless, ultimately, after a poll, the name Leñadores was chosen.

The team played in the Circuito Mexicano de Básquetbol, the top level of Mexican basketball in those years, from its establishment in 1979 till 1998, winning four titles in 1979, 1981, 1984 and 1994.

In 2002, Leñadores joined Liga Nacional de Baloncesto Profesional, where they played for only three seasons. The team was disbanded after the 2004 season. Previously, the franchise intended to withdraw after the 2003 season, but it stayed for one more season after securing several sponsorship agreements.

In 2018, it was announced that Leñadores would return to professional basketball after 13 years of absence.

The team has always played at the Auditorio del Pueblo as their home arena.

Players

Current roster

Honours

Domestic competitions
 Circuito Mexicano de Básquetbol
 Winners (4): 1979, 1981, 1984, 1994

References

External links 
 Team profile 

Basketball teams in Mexico
Sports teams in Durango
Durango City
Basketball teams established in 1979
1979 establishments in Mexico